Nijbari railway station is a railway station on Katihar–Siliguri branch of Howrah–New Jalpaiguri line in the Katihar railway division of Northeast Frontier Railway zone. It is situated beside Fulbari Ghoshpukur Bypass, Mahipal at Nijbari of Darjeeling district in the Indian state of West Bengal.

References

Railway stations in Darjeeling district
Katihar railway division